The 2018 Tripura Legislative Assembly election was held on 18 February for 59 of the state's 60 constituencies. The counting of votes took place on 3 March 2018. With 43.59% of the vote, the BJP secured a majority of seats (36) and subsequently formed the government with Biplab Kumar Deb as Chief Minister. The former governing Left Front alliance while receiving 44.35% of the vote secured only 16 seats.

Background 
The term of the Tripura Legislative Assembly ended on 6 March 2018. Having governed Tripura since the 1998 election, the ruling Left Front alliance, under Chief Minister Manik Sarkar, sought re-election. Meanwhile, the region in general had been under the political control of the Communist Party for 25 years prior to the election, leading to the region being dubbed a "red holdout".

Their primary challengers came in the form of the Bharatiya Janata Party, which under the leadership of Narendra Modi was the governing party of India on a national level. The BJP is a nationalist, rightist party, whose policies directly oppose those of the Communists. However, the party claimed no seats, and a mere 1.5% of the vote, in the region's previous election. Despite the relatively small size of Tripura, the election took on additional significance on a national level as it was an acid test to gauge the successes of the BJP ahead of the following year's general election, and a chance to strip the communists, the party's "primary ideological enemy", of its stronghold.

Prior to the election, a number of workers of the BJP were murdered. The BJP alleged that the murders were committed by CPI(M) members, which the party denies.

Schedule 
The Election Commission of India announced that the Legislative Assembly elections in Tripura would be held on 18 February 2018 and the results would be announced on 3 March 2018.

Electoral process changes
VVPAT-fitted EVMs was used in entire Tripura state in all polling stations in the 2018 elections, which was the first time that the entire state saw the implementation of VVPAT.

The election took place in a single phase on 18 February 2018 with 89.8% voter turnout. The results were announced on 3 March 2018.

Contesting parties 
297 candidates registered to contest the election.

Candidates

Campaign
The other major force in the election was the Indian National Congress, who had taken 36.5% of the popular vote in the region in 2013. They are also, on a wider scale, the largest force in opposing Modi and the BJP in parliament. As such, Rahul Gandhi, in his capacity as the party's leader, campaigned in the region. They were determined to prevent the BJP from seizing control on the region, as such an outcome would represent the "demise of the Left".

Exit Polls

Results
The incumbent Left Front government was defeated after 25 years of office out of which Manik Sarkar served for about 20 years, with the Bharatiya Janata Party and Indigenous Peoples Front of Tripura winning a large majority of seats. The Indian National Congress, which was the second largest party in the 2013 election, lost all its seats and most of its vote share.

Results by party

Results

Highlights

No. of Constituencies

Electors

Performance of Women Candidates

Reactions
The BJP chose Biplab Kumar Deb to be the next Chief Minister. He said: "I am ready to take the responsibility. I will not run away from taking the responsibility. I have already been given a bigger responsibility, the party's state presidentship, which I have been fulfilling to the best of my ability. People responded favourably to our call 'Chalo Paltai' (let's change)." He claimed that having the same party in the central government and at the state level "helps in faster development." He further called for restraint in post-electoral violence: "We do not believe in the politics of vengeance and hatred, so we appeal to the people to maintain peace and calm." In addition he asserted that "the word development does not exist in the dictionary of the CPI-M. Our government will provide good governance and time-bound implementation of all developmental works."

Former Chief Minister of Kerala and senior CPI(M) leader V. S. Achuthanandan called for the party's leadership to ally with "secular forces" to defeat the Sangh Parivar: "The country is facing serious challenges. The Congress, which had ruled for decades in the post-independence period, has become weaker now. He supported party General Secretary Sitaram Yechury's call for an "understanding" with the INC as "a tactical move with secular forces was necessary." The party's provincial minister claimed that the BJP had "misused" money and power at the central government in winning the election and that the "challenge to the democracy and the national integrity." Another CPM figure M. V. Jayarajan, private secretary to Kerala Chief Minister Pinarayi Vijayan, claimed that the INC voters and leaders were moving towards the BJP and that the result should "not be viewed lightly and all the patriots in the country have the responsibility to check and isolate any effort of the communal forces gaining strength in the country. Politburo member M. A. Baby said that while the result was "unexpected", he did "respect the verdict of the people." He added: "However, there is a decline of 6-7 per cent vote share of the Left front. It's a concern...how the erosion has taken place and why this happened will be dispassionately examined by the party in Tripura and the national leadership."

Media
It was suggested that in order to defeat the BJP, other opposition parties would have to unite.

Charilam bypoll
Polling for the seat of Charilam was postponed to 12 March 2018 after the death of Communist Party of India (Marxist) incumbent candidate Ramendra Narayan Debbarma. The CPI(M) withdrew their candidate for the bypoll claiming that there was an increase in violence.

Despite this, the CPI(M) candidate continued to be present on the ballot paper, and subsequently lost their deposit.

See also 
 Elections in India
 2018 elections in India
 Tripura Legislative Assembly

References

External links
Election Commission of India
Full results by district

Tripura
2018
12th Tripura Legislative Assembly